Frederick Daniel Shreeve (17 December 1882 - 1962) was an English footballer who played for Gresley Rovers, Burton United, Millwall, West Ham United, Doncaster Rovers and Bentley Colliery.

Career
Nicknamed "Sparrow", Shreeve started his footballing career with Stanton FC, Newhall Swifts FC and then Gresley Rovers but after only one season moved on to play for Burton United. Two seasons with Millwall followed before he signed for West Ham United in 1908. He made his debut on 24 October 1908 against Northampton Town; a 2–1 West Ham win in which Shreeve scored. He missed only one game in his first season for The Hammers. Two further seasons followed before he moved on to play for Doncaster Rovers. After leaving Doncaster Rovers he had spells with Bentley Colliery and Methley Perseverance from 1919 until 1920 when he finished his footballing career.

He was the father of Jack Shreeve who played for Charlton Athletic in the 1946 and 1947 FA Cup Finals.

References

1882 births
1962 deaths
English footballers
Association football defenders
Gresley F.C. players
Burton United F.C. players
Millwall F.C. players
West Ham United F.C. players
Doncaster Rovers F.C. players
Bentley Colliery F.C. players
Methley Perseverance F.C. players
English Football League players
Southern Football League players
Midland Football League players
People from Newhall, Derbyshire
Footballers from Derbyshire